NSB InterCity Express or ICE was a premium medium distance railway service provided by Norwegian State Railways (NSB) on the routes Oslo–Lillehammer (along parts of the Dovre Line), Oslo–Skien (along the Vestfold Line) and Oslo–Halden–Göteborg (along the Østfold Line) between 1992 and 1999. A subset of NSB's sixteen Class 70 electric multiple units were assigned for the service.

History
The service was introduced in 1992 when the first nine Class 70 units were delivered. The new services would offer hourly headway on the involved routes, bypassing many smaller stops that would be served by commuter trains. The extension to Göteborg was only offered thrice each day. In January 1999, the ICE brand was disbanded. In April 1999, the former ICE routes became part of the Agenda brand.

Norwegian State Railways
Norwegian brands
Rail transport brands